Diporiphora gracilis, the gracile two-lined dragon, is a species of agama found in Australia.

References

Diporiphora
Agamid lizards of Australia
Taxa named by Paul Doughty
Taxa named by Paul Horner (herpetologist)
Taxa named by Jane Melville
Taxa named by Katie Smith Date
Reptiles described in 2019